Ryan Bailey (born 11 November 1984) is an English former rugby league footballer. A Great Britain and England international representative , he played the majority of his club career at the Leeds Rhinos, making over 300 appearances and winning six Super League championships and three World Club Challenges with the club. After leaving Leeds, Bailey played for Hull Kingston Rovers, Castleford Tigers (Heritage № 958) and the Warrington Wolves. After Super League his playing career continued in League 1 with a Canadian club, Toronto Wolfpack (Heritage № 23), and then at Workington Town. He then went to Leigh Centurions in the Championship. mother Julie bailey  ..

Background
Bailey was born in Leeds, West Yorkshire, England. His father is of West Indian heritage.

Playing career

Leeds Rhinos

Bailey made his Super League début for Leeds in 2002 at age 18.

He was then selected in the Great Britain team to compete in the end of season 2004 Rugby League Tri-Nations tournament. In the final against Australia Bailey played from the interchange bench in the Lions' 44–4 loss.

As Super League IX champions, the Leeds club faced 2004 NRL season premiers, the Canterbury-Bankstown Bulldogs in the 2005 World Club Challenge. Bailey played in the 2008 Super League Grand Final victory over St Helens.

Bailey played in the 2009 Super League Grand Final victory over St. Helens at Old Trafford.
Bailey played in the 2010 Challenge Cup Final defeat by Warrington at Wembley Stadium.
Bailey played from the interchange bench for Leeds in the 2011 Challenge Cup Final defeat by the Wigan at Wembley Stadium.

Bailey played in the 2011 Super League Grand Final victory over St. Helens at Old Trafford.

Bailey played in the 2012 Challenge Cup Final defeat by Warrington at Wembley Stadium.

Bailey played in the 2012 Super League Grand Final victory over Warringtonat Old Trafford.
In 2014, Leeds held a testimonial game for Bailey against London Broncos. On 8 May 2014, he made his 300th career appearance for the Leeds club. Bailey played in the 2014 Challenge Cup Final victory over the Castleford Tigers at Wembley Stadium.

Hull KR
In 2015 Bailey moved to Hull Kingston Rovers. He was not fit enough to play former club Leeds in the opening game of the season but went on to score on his début the week after. In March it was announced Bailey had been released because of personal issues after only playing one game for the club.

Castleford Tigers
A month later he joined the Castleford Tigers for the remainder of the season where he rejoined former coach Daryl Powell. He played six games and scored one try before being released at the end of the season.

Warrington Wolves
In November 2015 Warrington announced the signing of Bailey on a one-year contract for the 2016 season. There, he would play under Tony Smith again with whom he won two Grand Finals with at Leeds. Bailey publicly opened up about his struggle with depression in 2016.
He played in the 2016 Challenge Cup Final defeat by Hull F.C. at Wembley Stadium.
He played in the 2016 Super League Grand Final defeat by Wigan at Old Trafford.

Toronto Wolfpack
Ahead of the 2017 season, Bailey signed for newcomers to Rugby League Toronto. He made his début for the new club in an 80-0 victory over North Wales Crusaders. He then went on to play in seven more games that year and helped in securing the Wolfpack's Kingston Press League 1 triumph and subsequent promotion to the Betfred Championship.  On 18 January 2018, it was reported that Bailey, along with teammates Fuifui Moimoi and David Taylor, parted ways with the club by "mutual agreement" following a preseason training camp in Portugal. It was later reported that the players had twice missed curfew during the trip.

Workington Town
After his departure from Toronto, Bailey joined league 1 side Workington in January 2018. After playing just six games for the Cumbrian team, Bailey was offered a chance to move up to the Championship to play for Leigh and left Workington in April 2018.

Leigh Centurions and retirement
Bailey joined Leigh in April 2018 and made 11 appearances for the club in the 2018 season. In November 2018, Bailey joined Featherstone Rovers on a trial contract but decided to retire from the game in February 2019 aged 35.

Controversies
In July 2003, he was found guilty of brawling in the street in Leeds, and was sent to a young offender institution for nine months.

He was then selected in the Great Britain team to compete in the end of season 2004 Rugby League Tri-Nations tournament. In the final against Australia Bailey played from the interchange bench in the Lions' 44–4 loss. On 23 December 2004 the Rugby Football League fined Bailey along with Leeds' teammate Keith Senior £1,500 each after they tested positive to the banned stimulant ephedrine.

Bailey was charged with "evading, refusing or failing to submit to sample collection" during a routine drugs testing session at Toronto's Lamport Stadium on 30 May 2017. An arbitration panel appointed by the UK National Anti-Doping Panel concluded that Bailey had committed an anti-doping rule violation, but that the exceptional circumstances of the case were such that there was no fault or negligence to be apportioned to Bailey and therefore no suspension under the anti-doping rules should be applied.  The panel heard evidence, including psychiatric evidence, over three days and heard that Bailey had during the testing process, developed a genuine, if unjustified, belief that the water offered to him by the testing officials was contaminated in some way.  The panel also noted that Bailey did take a drugs test three days after the original incident that was negative and stressed that they did not consider Bailey a cheat or someone trying to cover up drug taking.  The case is believed to be the first case where a player who has refused to take a test has not been punished.

Honours
Leeds Rhinos
Super League:
Winner (6): 2004, 2007, 2008, 2009, 2011, 2012
Runner up (1): 2005

Challenge Cup:
Winner (1): 2014
Runner up (1): 2005, 2010, 2011, 2012

Warrington Wolves
Super League:
Runner up (1): 2016

Challenge Cup:
Runner up (1): 2016

Toronto Wolfpack
League 1:
Winner (1): 2017

References

Further reading
Full decision of the National Anti-Doping Panel

External links

Workington Town profile

1983 births
Living people
Black British sportsmen
British people convicted of assault
Castleford Tigers players
England national rugby league team players
English sportspeople of Jamaican descent
English rugby league players
Great Britain national rugby league team players
Hull Kingston Rovers players
Leeds Rhinos players
Leigh Leopards players
Rugby league players from Leeds
Rugby league props
Toronto Wolfpack players
Warrington Wolves players
Workington Town players